The 2019 Orlando City SC season was the club's ninth season of existence in Orlando and fifth season in Major League Soccer, the top-flight league in the United States soccer league system. Alongside Major League Soccer, the club also competed in the U.S. Open Cup, reaching the semi-finals for the first time.

Season review

Pre-season 
During the offseason, Orlando City parted ways with General Manager Niki Budalić who had been at the club since January 2016 and held the role of GM for two years. He was replaced in the role by FC Dallas vice president of soccer operations Luiz Muzzi. The day after Budalić departed, the club announced that a total of nine players were out of contract, most notably captain Jonathon Spector marking the second consecutive season the team's captain had left following Kaká's retirement a year earlier.

The club undertook its second major roster rebuild in as many years during James O'Connor's first winter transfer window in Orlando. By the end of December the team had already sold Amro Tarek, Mohamed El Monir and Yoshimar Yotún who had all featured in major roles in 2018 while bringing in two of O'Connor's former Louisville City players Greg Ranjitsingh and Kyle Smith from USL, as well as Ecuador international Sebas Méndez.

Benji Michel was signed to a Homegrown deal, becoming the club's fifth homegrown player; the first to be born in Orlando and come up through the Development Academy. The team also tried to sign Santiago Patiño to a Homegrown contract but the move was controversially blocked by MLS. Luiz Muzzi continued to argue the case throughout the Combine and events leading up to the SuperDraft stating "We feel like the league did us wrong on this one." Orlando eventually decided to draft him with their #3 overall pick with O'Connor describing the selection as "a message to all our other homegrowns."

Orlando announced six preseason matches for 2019 including the inaugural iteration of the OC Invitational, a preseason friendly tournament that would feature New York City FC, New England Revolution and Minnesota United with each team facing two of the other three participants. It marked only the second time that the club would play preseason games open to the public following a friendly against Bahia in February 2016. The Lions lifted the OC Invitational trophy after winning both of their games against New York City FC and New England Revolution. Minnesota United would finish on the same record but with worse goal difference.

On February 18, Orlando unveiled Portuguese international winger Nani as a Designated Player, joining on a free transfer from Sporting CP.

March 
Orlando's fifth MLS campaign began at home to New York City FC on March 2, marking the third time the two 2015 expansion teams faced each other on opening weekend. The game finished 2–2 after the Lions trailed 2–0 at the break thanks to goals by Mueller and debutant Akindele. The result meant Orlando remained unbeaten on matchday one since joining MLS. The following week Orlando traveled to Chicago for their first road game of the season. The game ended 1–1 when C.J. Sapong equalized for 10-man Fire in the final minute. It marked the first time since April 29, 2018 that Orlando had earned any points away from home. The first defeat of the season came in week three as Orlando lost 3–1 to Montreal Impact at home. Ignacio Piatti scored a brace to take his all-time individual total against the Lions to 10 goals in 10 games, the most of any single player against Orlando in MLS while Orlando City goalkeeper Brian Rowe was forced into a career-high eight saves. The following week, Orlando went to reigning Supporters' Shield winners New York Red Bulls and got their first win of the season. Former Red Bulls captain Sacha Kljestan scored the only goal of the game as the Lions got their first road win since April 29, 2018, the first of James O'Connor's reign, and also kept their first clean sheet on the road since April 13, 2018. The month ended with a 2–1 defeat to D.C. United. The result followed a series of controversial calls on the Rooney goal including a phantom foul, incorrect ball placement and impeding of the Orlando goalkeeper, none of which were called or looked at by VAR and led to a post-match tirade by O'Connor who slammed the officiating.

April 
On April 6, Orlando earned their first home win of the season. Designated player Nani scored his first goals for the club including an 89th-minute penalty to secure a 4–3 win over Colorado Rapids following a lengthy lightning delay at half-time. Orlando's first away loss of the season was on April 13 when they fell 2–1 to Real Salt Lake. It was the first time in the teams' five meetings that RSL had won. In their next game, Orlando earned their first ever victory over Vancouver Whitecaps with Nani deflecting in a late 88th-minute winner. Orlando's final game in April was the reverse fixture of the season opener against NYCFC, ending in another draw like the first meeting. Nani scored in his fourth consecutive game to equal Dom Dwyer's club record goal streak set in April 2018.

May 
On May 2, MLS officially announced Atlético Madrid as the opposition for the 2019 MLS All-Star Game set to be hosted by Orlando City SC at Orlando City Stadium on July 31. On May 4, the team were held scoreless for the first time on the year in a 2–0 home defeat to Toronto FC. They had their second consecutive shutout loss a week later against Atlanta. On May 19, Orlando played new expansion side FC Cincinnati for the first time, beating them 5–1. It was the first time since May 6, 2018 that Orlando had won a game by more than one goal. The team ended with a frustrating 1–0 defeat to LA Galaxy having out-shot the visitors 19–4. On May 29, the team announced plans to move all of Orlando City's development pyramid to one single site, creating a new 20-acre state-of-the-art training complex at Osceola Heritage Park to house the senior team as well as OCB and the Development Academy.

June 
On June 1, Orlando opened the month with a 3–0 victory away to Montreal Impact, the team's first road win by multiple goals since April 13, 2018 when the Lions earned a 2–0 win over Philadelphia Union. On June 4, Orlando City held a press conference to announce the sale of the stadium's naming rights to Florida-based time share and vacation rental company Exploria Resorts. As a result, the stadium was renamed Exploria Stadium. On June 12, the team won their opening U.S. Open Cup game of the year 3–1 over USL Championship side Memphis 901, to progress to the Round of 16. The game was notable for Robin Jansson's first goal as a Lion. The following week, Orlando booked their place in the quarter-finals with a 2–1 victory after extra-time over fellow MLS side New England Revolution. On June 26, Orlando played their first league game since June 1 following two Open Cup matches. They lost 1–0 to D.C. United after Wayne Rooney scored from within his own half. The team's final game of June was away to Columbus Crew, a 2–0 victory to give the team their first winning record in June since their inaugural season in MLS.

July 
July opened with back to back games against Philadelphia Union home and away. On July 3, Orlando lost 3–1 at home with Jansson and Kljestan both receiving red cards during the game. The away match was originally scheduled for July 6 but a pre-match adverse weather delay due to lightning storms turned into a full postponement with MLS rescheduling the game for the next day - a decision that was not received well by Orlando City as it not only impacted the team's U.S. Open Cup quarter-final preparations but there were also three major international tournament finals on that day: Women's World Cup, Copa América and Gold Cup. Orlando would go on to draw the game 2–2, conceding a late equalizer to Kacper Przybyłko who had scored twice against the Lions earlier in the week. Following the game, an issue with the rescheduled travel arrangements meant the squad ended up stuck in Philadelphia for an additional second day. On July 10, Orlando City progressed to their first ever U.S. Open Cup semi-final, beating New York City FC on penalties after a 1–1 draw with Maxi Moralez scoring a 90+6-minute equalizer to send the game into extra-time. Adam Grinwis made two saves in the shoot-out. The game received viral media coverage for what became known as "The Running of The Wall." When NYCFC won the coin toss and elected to kick the penalties in front of an empty South Stand, the opposite side of the stadium to The Wall where the Orlando City supporters were housed, the Orlando fans took it upon themselves to run en masse down the length of the concourse and fill up the stand directly behind the goal the penalties were being taken. Three days later, Orlando hosted Columbus Crew in the league, winning 1–0 courtesy of late Benji Michel goal, his first in MLS. However, the team ended July with a run of three games without a win, taking a point on the road in a 1–1 draw to Portland Timbers before defeats to New York Red Bulls and New England Revolution.

Orlando hosted 2019 MLS All-Star week at the end of July. On July 29, Orlando City's eMLS professional FIFA player FIFA Abe, alongside guest player AnthFifa, won the eMLS All-Star Challenge that also featured Landon Donovan and Diego Forlán. The victory earned $5,000 for the Orlando City foundation. On July 30, MLS debuted a new skills challenge event, pitting three teams composed of All-Stars (Wayne Rooney, Jonathan dos Santos and Carlos Vela), Atlético Madrid players (Koke, Héctor Herrera and João Félix) as well as players from Orlando City (Nani, Sebas Méndez and Chris Mueller) against each other in a series of games created by F2Freestylers. The event, held at the ESPN Wide World of Sports Complex, was won by the Orlando City team after Nani hit the crossbar with the last kick of the competition, winning an additional $25,000 for the Orlando City Foundation. Nani was Orlando City's sole representative in the All-Star Game, coached by James O'Connor and won 3–0 by Atlético, while Benji Michel and Mason Stajduhar both featured in the 2019 MLS Homegrown Game.

August 
Orlando went on their longest unbeaten run in the league during August, avoiding defeat in four games. On August 3, Orlando returned to MLS action to record the team's first ever win over FC Dallas. Former Dallas player Tesho Akindele opened the scoring in his first appearance against the team following a move in the offseason before Carlos Ascues scored his first goal as a Lion since joining in 2018. On August 10, the team earned a 1–1 draw against Toronto FC before returning to Orlando for a midweek game against Sporting Kansas City, winning 1–0. On August 17, Orlando visited Allianz Field for the first time to play Minnesota United, coached by former Orlando head coach Adrian Heath. Minnesota scored a stoppage time equalizer in the 1–1 draw after a Nani penalty had put Orlando ahead. At the end of the gameweek, Orlando had moved back up to eight place in the conference. However, two shutout losses to Atlanta United and San Jose Earthquakes to end August saw the team drop back down to ninth.

September 
On September 7, Orlando City hosted Los Angeles FC who remained 11 points clear at the top of the Supporters' Shield standings, earning a point in a 2–2 draw despite again leading late in the second half. On September 14, with only four games left in the season, Orlando faced playoff rivals New England Revolution who were four points ahead of Orlando and occupying the final playoff spot heading into the game. Despite trailing 3–1 at halftime, Orlando fought back to score two unanswered goals and earn a 3–3 draw. Nani was involved in every goal, scoring twice and registering one assist to set a new team record in single-season goal involvements with 21. However, a win for Chicago Fire pushed Orlando down to tenth while they still remained four points behind New England. On September 21, Orlando traveled to face Houston Dynamo. Having taken the lead through a sixth minute Dwyer goal, their earliest goal of the season, Orlando had the potential to move back up the eighth and back within two points of the playoffs were they to hold on to the lead as both New England and Chicago had tied in their earlier matches. However, two unanswered second half goals for Houston meant Orlando lost 2–1, keeping them in tenth. On September 29, Orlando's final away game of the season and the team's first trip to FC Cincinnati, ended in a 1–1 draw. The result, coupled with New England's victory over NYCFC, officially eliminated the team from playoff contention with one regular season game left. Benji Michel's goal was the 75th goal FC Cincinnati had conceded in 2019. It broke the MLS record for most goals conceded in a single season set the previous year by Orlando City.

October 
Orlando City had the opportunity to leapfrog Chicago Fire on the final day of the season but lost 5–2 to Chicago at home, keeping the team 11th in the Eastern Conference, 22nd in the Supporters' Shield standings and taking their winless streak to eight to end the season. The following day the club announced they had parted ways with James O'Connor.

Roster 

 Last updated on July 30, 2019

Staff

Competitions

Friendlies
Orlando City's 2019 preseason began on January 21 with a training camp at IMG Academy in Bradenton, Florida. They played a closed-door friendly at IMG against New York Red Bulls before traveling back to Orlando for closed-door friendlies against O'Connor's former team Louisville City FC and Philadelphia Union. The schedule concluded with two games in the inaugural OC Invitational that were open to the public and a third match against OC Invitational competitors Minnesota United FC that did not count towards the competition standings nor was it open to the public.

Major League Soccer 

 All times in regular season on Eastern Daylight Time (UTC−04:00) except where otherwise noted.

Outside of the club, FC Cincinnati joined the league as an expansion franchise, bringing the total number of MLS clubs to 24. Orlando City played FC Cincinnati for the first time on May 19, 2019, a 5–1 win. The team's first trip to Cincinnati will be on September 29, 2019.

With the addition of a 24th team, MLS was able to create a more balanced schedule in the sense that every team will play their conference opponents twice (home and away) and the 12 remaining teams in the opposite conference once to make up the 34-game schedule.

Results summary

Results

Standings

Eastern Conference table

Overall table

U.S. Open Cup

Orlando City entered the U.S. Open Cup in the fourth round, having been drawn against USL Championship team Memphis 901 FC. As a result of being drawn first, Memphis were the designated host team. In the Round of 16, Orlando beat fellow MLS team New England Revolution in extra-time to set up a quarter-final against New York City FC. The team triumphed 5–4 in a penalty shootout after a Maxi Moralez stoppage time equalizer forced extra time with the game ending 1–1. It set up a meeting with Atlanta United in the team's first Open Cup semi-final in history but the Lions lost 2–0. The game set a new club attendance record for the competition.

Squad statistics

Appearances

Starting appearances are listed first, followed by substitute appearances after the + symbol where applicable.

|-
! colspan=10 style=background:#dcdcdc; text-align:center|Goalkeepers

|-
! colspan=10 style=background:#dcdcdc; text-align:center|Defenders

|-
! colspan=10 style=background:#dcdcdc; text-align:center|Midfielders

|-
! colspan=10 style=background:#dcdcdc; text-align:center|Forwards

|-
|colspan="10"|Players away from the club on loan:

|}

Goalscorers

Shutouts

Disciplinary record

Player movement
Per Major League Soccer and club policies, terms of the deals do not get disclosed.

MLS SuperDraft picks 
Draft picks are not automatically signed to the team roster. The 2019 draft was held on January 11, 2019. Orlando had five selections.

Transfers in

Loans in

Transfers out

Loans out

Broadcasting
Orlando City will be featured on national television 6 times during the 2019 season, while all remaining matches will be televised locally on WRBW My65. This means that 30 of Orlando's 34 regular-season matches will be broadcast on FOX entities between FOX 35, My65 and Fox Sports. Following City's exclusive streaming partner deal with YouTube TV made in May 2018, YouTube TV online subscribers will have access to all of FOX's locally and nationally televised matches.

Radio coverage for City will be provided in both English and Spanish during the 2019 season. La Nueva 990 AM will serve as the Spanish language broadcaster while English commentary will be split between FM 96.9 The Game and Real Radio 104.1 FM all season long.

References 

Orlando City SC seasons
o
Orlando City
Orlando City